Seraphim (Greek, Σεραφείμ) born Vissarion Tikas (Greek, Βησσαρίων Τίκας) (26 October 1913 – 10 April 1998) was Archbishop of Athens and All Greece from 1974 to 1998.

Biography
He was born in Artesiano, a borough of Karditsa in Greece, in 1913. Archbishop Seraphim of Athens enrolled in the Theological School of the University of Athens in 1936 and graduated in 1940. During his second year (1938), he became a monk in the Pendeli Monastery.

Seraphim of Athens was ordained a deacon by the then Metropolitan Bishop of Corinth and by Archbishop Damaskinos of Athens, and served at the Church of the Holy Trinity in Neo Iraklio.

In 1942 he was ordained a priest and an archimandrite, also by Archbishop Damaskinos and served as parish priest at the Church of St Luke in Patisia. During the Axis occupation of Greece during World War II, he joined the ranks of EDES under general Napoleon Zervas.

He served as secretary of the Holy Synod of the Church of Greece, and in 1949, was elected Metropolitan Bishop of Arta and in 1958 was transferred to Ioannina.

Archbishop Seraphim of Athens was elected Archbishop of Athens and All Greece on January 13, 1974, succeeding Archbishop Ieronymos I.

As prelate of the Church of Greece, he visited the Patriarchates of Constantinople, Antioch, Moscow, Sofia and Belgrade.

During his 24 years as church leader he swore in six Presidents of Greece and numerous Prime Ministers. He died in Athens on April 10, 1998.

References

1913 births
1998 deaths
People from Karditsa
Archbishops of Athens and All Greece
Bishops of Ioannina
20th-century Eastern Orthodox archbishops
National and Kapodistrian University of Athens alumni
Greek Resistance members
Recipients of the War Cross (Greece)